The 1964 Chatham Cup was the 37th annual nationwide knockout football competition in New Zealand.

The competition was run on a regional basis, with regional associations each holding separate qualifying rounds. As there were different numbers of rounds in each region, the round names given here are only approximate.

Other teams taking part in the final rounds are known to have included Napier Rovers.

Highlights and lowlights
Noteworthy incidents which occurred during the 1964 Chatham Cup include a match between Kawerau and Whakatane Town, which was delayed for 20 minutes after a goal collapsed when Whakatane forward B. Good slid into the net while scoring his side's first goal. A match between Mount Roskill and Whangarei High School Old Boys was also delayed when a late switch of venue caused several Whangarei players to fail to arrive at the ground. The match was delayed before Whangarei finally took to the field with several reserve players.

Kotuku 
Kotuku, one of the last sides to enter the Chatham Cup from the West Coast of New Zealand, were denied by the NZFA in 1964 as the team were determined to be a regional representative side, not a club team as the cup competition rules required.

The 1964 final
The Mount had the perfect start to the final, with Geoff Cozens scoring in the second minute. Ray Darby doubled the lead halfway through the first half, and the Aucklanders went to the break 2-0 up. Darby made it three in the 73rd minute, and the 80th-minute strike from Tech's Bill Porteous was merely a consolation effort.

Results

First round

Second round

Claudelands Rovers beat either Tokoroa or Huntly
Hamilton beat either Tokoroa or Huntly

Third round

Fourth round

Fifth round

Quarter-finals ("Zone finals")

Semi-finals ("Island finals")

Final

References

Rec.Sport.Soccer Statistics Foundation New Zealand 1964 page

Chatham Cup
Chatham Cup
Chatham Cup
September 1964 sports events in New Zealand